Mark Stepanovich Redkin (1908  1987) was a Soviet photographer.

He worked for the Kommunist (1928–1932) and later for the TASS. During World War II he was correspondent of Krasnaia Zvezda and covered many important events, from Soviet invasion of Poland in 1939 to the fall of Berlin and surrender of Japan in 1945. Later he worked for the Planeta publishing house.

Redkin is renowned for his participation in two separate around-the-world expeditions, the first of which took place in 1933 and the second in 1961.

Notes

References
Short biography

Further reading
Mark Redkin, Izbrannye fotografii, Planeta (1978)

External links
Redkin's work mentioned: Photography in the thaw; Inside Photography, Historical Dictionary of War Journalism

1908 births
1987 deaths
Russian photographers
Soviet photographers